Tucker Gates is an American television director and producer. He has directed several episodes of the ABC series Alias and Lost. He has also directed episodes of Bates Motel, Weeds, Carnivàle, Point Pleasant, Huff, Boston Legal, Roswell, Brothers & Sisters, Homeland, House of Cards, Ray Donovan, The Office, and Parks and Recreation.

Selected television credits
The X-Files (1993) TV series
episode 3.19 "Hell Money"
episode 4.11 "El Mundo Gira"
Angel (1999) TV series
episode 1.09 "Hero"
Samantha Who? (2007) TV series
episode 1.07 "The Hockey Date"
episode 1.09 "The Break Up"
The Office (2006) TV series
episode 3.07 "Branch Closing"
episode 3.22 "Women's Appreciation"
episode 4.17 "Job Fair"
episode 7.17 "Threat Level Midnight"
CSI: Crime Scene Investigation (2002) TV series
episode 3.04 "A Little Murder"
Alias (2001) TV series
episode 5.03 "The Shed"
episode 5.09 "The Horizon"
episode 5.11 "Maternal Instinct"
episode 5.15 "No Hard Feelings"
episode 5.17 "All the Time in the World"
Weeds (2005) TV series
episode 1.07 "Higher Education"
episode 2.06 "Crush Girl Love Panic"
Lost (2004) TV series
episode 1.08 "Confidence Man"
episode 1.17 "…In Translation"
episode 1.22 "Born to Run"
episode 3.06 "I Do"
episode 6.04 "The Substitute"
episode 6.09 "Ab Aeterno"
episode 6.15 "Across the Sea"
Carnivàle (2003) TV Series
episode 2.06 "The Road To Damascus"
Point Pleasant (2005) TV series
episode 1.01 "Pilot"
Huff (2004) TV series
episode 1.04 "Control"
Boston Legal (2004) TV series
episode 1.06 "Truth Be Told"
Parks and Recreation (2009) TV series
episode 3.04 "Ron & Tammy: Part Two"
episode 4.11 "The Comeback Kid"
Undercovers (2010) TV series
episode 1.03 "Devices"
episode 1.11 "The Key to It All"
House (2010) TV series
episode 7.07 "A Pox On Our House"
Homeland (2011) TV series
episode 1.08 "Achilles Heel"
episode 5.09 "The Litvinov Ruse"
episode 6.07 "Imminet Risk"
episode 7.08 "Lies, Amplifers, Fucking Twitter"
episode 8.06 "Two Minutes"
New Girl (2012) TV series
episode 1.13 "Valentine's Day"
Touch (2012) TV series
episode 1.04 "Kite Strings"
Political Animals (2012) TV series
episode 1.05 "16 Hours"
Bates Motel (2013) TV series
episode 1.01 "First You Dream, Then You Die"
episode 1.02 "Nice Town You Picked, Norma..."
episode 1.06 "The Truth"
episode 1.09 "Underwater"
episode 1.10 "Midnight"
episode 2.01 "Gone But Not Forgotten"
episode 2.02 "Shadow of a Doubt"
episode 2.09 "The Box"
episode 2.10 "The Immutable Truth"
episode 3.01 "A Death in the Family"
episode 3.02 "The Arcanum Club"
episode 3.09 "Crazy"
episode 3.10 "Unconscious" 
episode 4.01 "A Danger to Himself and Others"
episode 4.10 "Norman"
episode 5.01 "Dark Paradise"
episode 5.10 "The Cord"
Ray Donovan (2013) TV series
episode 1.10 "Fite Nite"
episode 2.01 "Yo Soy Capitan"
episode 2.04 "S U C K"
episode 3.07 "All Must Be Loved"
episode 4.08 "The Texan"
episode 5.04 "Sold"
episode 6.03 "He Be Tight, He Be Mean"
episode 6.04 "Pudge"
episode 7.04 "Hispes"
Brooklyn Nine-Nine (2014) TV series
episode 1.18 "The Apartment"
Tyrant (2014) TV series
episode 1.06 "What the World Needs Now"
House of Cards (2015) TV series
episode 3.03 "Chapter 29"
episode 3.04 "Chapter 30"
episode 4.01 "Chapter  40"
The Good Place (2016) TV series
episode 1.06 "What We Owe To Each Other"
Patriot (2017) TV series
episode 1.06 "The Dynamics Of Flow"
The Sinner (2017) TV series
episode 1.07 "Part VII"
episode 1.08 "Part VIII"
episode 2.07 "Part VII"
The Orville (2017) TV series
episode 1.07 "Majority Rule"
Strange Angel (2018) TV series
episode 1.03 "Ritual Of The Rival Tribes"
The Morning Show (2019) TV series
episode 1.06 "The Pendulum Swings"
Truth Be Told (2019) TV series
episode 1.05 "Graveyard Love"
The Stand (2020) TV series
episode 1.02 "Pocket Savior"
Swimming with Sharks (2022) TV series 
episode 1.01 "Chapter One"
episode 1.02 "Chapter Two"
episode 1.03 "Chapter Three"
episode 1.04 "Chapter Four"
episode 1.05 "Chapter Five"
episode 1.06 "Chapter Six"
The Terminal List (2022) TV series
episode 1.05 "Disruption"
Surface (2022) TV series
episode 1.08 "See You on the Other Side"
American Gigolo (2022) TV series 
episode 1.03 "Rapture"

References

External links

American television directors
American television producers
Living people
Place of birth missing (living people)
Year of birth missing (living people)